David Schütter (born David Schütter-Wieske in 1991) is a German actor who has appeared in numerous films, television series and theatres.

Career 
Born in Hamburg, a city in Northern Germany, David Schütter is grandson of the German actor Friedrich Schütter. Before the school, he had already made his screen debut in the NDR series Die Pfefferkörner in 2008, following another appearance in Da kommt Kalle, in 2010. In 2011, he had a supporting role in the ZDF crime detective series Stubbe – Von Fall zu Fall, and another supporting role in Küstenwache in 2012.

He was cast in the title role of the 2014 documentary miniseries Alexander the Great, whom he played 'in a dramatic exaggeration, spitting out the big notes instead of articulating them'. He also played the lead role in the 41-minute short film Porn Punk Poetry (2014). With tattoos, bleached hair and mohawk, he embodied the 27-year-old Damon, who works as a male prostitute, but is now too old for this gay scene and is at a turning point in his life when he meets the young Russian Emma. Schütter represented 'a soul between hardship and romance'. The same year he starred in the award-winning drama film We Are Young. We Are Strong, as neo-Nazi Sandro.

In the 2019 two-part television thriller Walpurgisnacht – Die Mädchen und der Tod, he embodied the amateur photographer Alexander Zimmermann, who is suspected of being a possible misogynist.

In 2020, Schütter was featured in the film Persian Lessons, the miniseries  and the Netflix historical series Barbarians.

Filmography

Film

Television

References

External links 
 

1991 births
Living people
Male actors from Hamburg
German male film actors
German male television actors
21st-century German male actors